Argyll Forest Park is a forest park located on the Cowal peninsula in Argyll and Bute, Scottish Highlands. Established in 1935, it was the first forest park to be created in the United Kingdom.  The park is managed by Forestry and Land Scotland, and covers 211 km2 in total.

From the Holy Loch in the south to the Arrochar Alps in the north, the park includes a variety of landscapes, from high peaks to freshwater and seawater lochs.

Much of the forest park lies within the Loch Lomond and The Trossachs National Park, which was established in 2002, however the forests at Corlarach and Ardyne in Cowal are outwith the national park boundary but within the forest park.

Gallery

Highlights

Forestry and Land Scotland highlight trails at the following places:
Glenbranter, bike trails and walks, featuring ancient oaks
Puck's Glen, trail up rocky gorge among woodlands
 Benmore, forest around Benmore Botanic Garden, with giant trees
Kilmun Arboretum, collection of tree species in woodland groves
Ardentinny, easy trails and beach walk

References

External links

 Argyll Forest Park leaflet
 Argyll Forest Park website

Parks in Scotland
Cowal
Argyll and Bute
Argyll Forest Park
Highlands and Islands of Scotland
Forest parks of Scotland